Vicki Mowat is a Canadian politician, who was elected to the Legislative Assembly of Saskatchewan in a by-election on September 7, 2017. She represents the electoral district of Saskatoon Fairview as a member of the Saskatchewan New Democratic Party.

A former executive assistant to the associate dean of Aboriginal affairs at the University of Saskatchewan, she was also the party's candidate in the same district in the 2016 provincial election.

Vicki Mowat is a retired member of the Canadian Armed Forces, after serving in the Cadet Instructors Cadre – the branch of the Canadian Armed Forces that administers and trains the Cadet Program of Canada. Vicki Mowat served for several years at the Vernon Cadet Training Center, achieving the rank of Major.

Electoral record

References

Living people
Saskatchewan New Democratic Party MLAs
Women MLAs in Saskatchewan
Politicians from Saskatoon
21st-century Canadian politicians
21st-century Canadian women politicians
Year of birth missing (living people)